Ghost Diver is a 1957 American adventure film written and directed by Richard Einfeld and Merrill G. White, who usually worked as editors. The film stars James Craig, Audrey Totter, Nico Minardos, Lowell Brown, Rodolfo Hoyos Jr. and Pira Louis. The film was released in October 1957, by 20th Century Fox.

Plot
When a diver discovers an ancient idol in the sea below some South American cliffs, dive captain Manco Capao cuts his air line and kills him and takes the idol. He sells it to Richard Bristol, host of a television show. Richard, his son Bob, and his secretary Anne fly to South America and begin to explore the island where it was found. They meet the dead man's daughter, Pelu Rico, who shows Anne ruins of a "Paracan temple".

Richard and Bob discover an underwater cave below the ruins and decide to restore the idol to its location in the belief that it will point them to even more treasure. Manco attacks Richard while doing so, but Bob rescues him. Manco escapes, and sure enough the idol points him to more treasure. Manco attempts to kill Bob, but escapes again. Pelu and Bob go night-diving to find the treasure cave. Manco, crazed with a lust for gold, attacks Bob underwater. An earthquake strikes, and the collapsing cliffs kill Manco and seal the treasure cave forever. Bob escapes to the surface and his new-found love, Pelu.

Cast 
James Craig as Roger Bristol
Audrey Totter as Anne Stevens
Nico Minardos as Manco Capao
Lowell Brown as Robin Bristol
Rodolfo Hoyos Jr. as Papa Rico
Pira Louis as Pelu Rico

Production
Filming started August 13, 1957. One of the female leads was Pira Louis, a Syrian swim champion.

References

External links 
 

1957 films
20th Century Fox films
American adventure films
1957 adventure films
Treasure hunt films
Underwater action films
Films scored by Paul Sawtell
1950s English-language films
1950s American films